An N of 1 trial is a clinical trial in which a single patient is the entire trial, a single case study. A trial in which random allocation can be used to determine the order in which an experimental and a control intervention are given to a patient is an N of 1 randomized controlled trial. The order of experimental and control interventions can also be fixed by the researcher.

This type of study has enabled practitioners to achieve experimental progress without the overwhelming work of designing a group comparison study. It can be very effective in confirming causality. This can be achieved in many ways. One of the most common procedures is the ABA withdrawal experimental design, where the patient problem is measured before a treatment is introduced (baseline) and then measured again during the treatment and finally when the treatment has terminated. If the problem vanished during the treatment it can be established that the treatment was effective. But the N=1 study can also be executed in an AB quasi experimental way; this means that causality cannot be definitively demonstrated. Another variation is non-concurrent experimental design where different points in time are compared with one another. This experimental design also has a problem with causality, whereby statistical significance under a frequentist paradigm may be un-interpretable but other methods, such as clinical significance or Bayesian methods should be considered. Many consider this framework to be a proof of concept or hypothesis generating process to inform subsequent, larger clinical trials.

List of variation in N of 1 trial

Quasi experiment means that causality cannot be definitively demonstrated.
Experiment means that it can be demonstrated.

Examples
An N of 1 trial can be successfully implemented to determine optimal treatments for patients with diseases as diverse as osteoarthritis, chronic neuropathic pain and attention deficit hyperactivity disorder.

N-of-1 designs can also be observational and describe natural intra-individual changes in health-related behaviours or symptoms longitudinally. N-of-1 observational designs require complex statistical analysis of N-of-1 data however, a simple 10-step procedure is available.  There has also been work to adapt causal inference counterfactual methods for using n-of-1 observational studies to design subsequent n-of-1 trials.

While N-of-1 trials are increasing, results of a recent systematic review found that statistical analyses in these studies would improve with more methodological and statistical rigor across all periods of the studies.

The Quantified Self 
Recently, a proliferation of personal experiments akin to N=1 is occurring, along with some detailed reports about them. This trend has been sparked in part by the growing ease of collecting data and analysing it, and also motivated by the ability of individuals to report such data easily.

A famous proponent and active experimenter was Seth Roberts, who reported on his self-experimental findings on his blog, and later published The Shangri-La Diet based on his conclusions from these self-experiments.

Global networks 
The International Collaborative Network for N-of-1 Trials and Single-Case Designs (ICN) is a global network for clinicians, researchers and consumers who have an interest in these methods. There are over 400 members of the ICN who are based in over 30 countries across the globe. The ICN was established in 2017 and is co-chaired by A/Prof. Jane Nikles and Dr Suzanne McDonald.

See also 
 Applied behavior analysis
 B. F. Skinner
 Single-subject design
 Crossover study

References

Further reading 

 
 
 
 

Clinical trials
Design of experiments